The 2016 NHL Entry Draft was the 54th NHL Entry Draft. The draft was held on June 24–25, 2016 at the First Niagara Center in Buffalo, New York. The first three selections were Auston Matthews going to the Toronto Maple Leafs, Patrik Laine going to the Winnipeg Jets, and Pierre-Luc Dubois going to the Columbus Blue Jackets.

Eligibility
Ice hockey players born between January 1, 1996, and September 15, 1998, were eligible for selection in the 2016 NHL Entry Draft. Additionally, un-drafted, non-North American players born in 1995 were eligible for the draft; and those players who were drafted in the 2014 NHL Entry Draft, but not signed by an NHL team and who were born after June 30, 1996, were also eligible to re-enter the draft.

Draft lottery
Since the 2012–13 NHL season all fourteen teams not qualifying for the Stanley Cup playoffs have a "weighted" chance at winning the first overall selection. Beginning with the 2014–15 NHL season the NHL changed the weighting system that was used in previous years. Under the new system the odds of winning the draft lottery for the four lowest finishing teams in the league decreased, while the odds for the other non-playoff teams increased. Starting with this draft the first three picks overall will be awarded by lottery. The odds of winning the second and third draws increased on a proportional basis depending on which team won the previous draw. The Toronto Maple Leafs, Winnipeg Jets and Columbus Blue Jackets won the draft lotteries that took place on April 30, 2016, giving them the first, second and third picks overall. Toronto retained the top pick, while Winnipeg and Columbus moved up from the sixth and fourth spots, respectively. In the process, the Edmonton Oilers and Vancouver Canucks were each knocked down two places from second and third to fourth and fifth overall, respectively, while the Calgary Flames dropped from fifth to sixth overall.

Top prospects
Source: NHL Central Scouting final (April 12, 2016) ranking.

Selections by round
The order of the 2016 Entry Draft is listed below.

Round one

Notes

 The New Jersey Devils' first-round pick went to the Ottawa Senators as the result of a trade on June 24, 2016 that sent a first-round pick and the Islanders' third-round pick both in 2016 (12th and 80th overall) to New Jersey in exchange for this pick.
 The Ottawa Senators' first-round pick went to the New Jersey Devils as the result of a trade on June 24, 2016 that sent a first-round pick (11th overall) to Ottawa in exchange for the Islanders' third-round pick in 2016 (80th overall) and this pick.
 The Detroit Red Wings' first-round pick went to the Arizona Coyotes as the result of a trade on June 24, 2016 that sent Joe Vitale, the Rangers' first-round pick and a compensatory second-round pick both in 2016 (20th and 53rd overall) to Detroit in exchange for the cap hit of Pavel Datsyuk and this pick.
 The Philadelphia Flyers' first-round pick went to the Winnipeg Jets as the result of a trade on June 24, 2016 that sent Chicago's first-round pick and a second-round pick both in 2016 (22nd and 36th overall) to Philadelphia in exchange for a third-round pick in 2016 (79th overall) and this pick.
 The New York Rangers' first-round pick went to the Detroit Red Wings as the result of a trade on June 24, 2016 that sent Pavel Datsyuk and a first-round pick in 2016 (16th overall) to Arizona in exchange for Joe Vitale, a compensatory second-round pick in 2016 (53rd overall) and this pick.
Arizona previously acquired this pick as the result of a trade on March 1, 2015 that sent Keith Yandle, Chris Summers and a fourth-round pick in 2016 to New York in exchange for John Moore, Anthony Duclair, Tampa Bay's second-round pick in 2015 and this pick (being conditional at the time of the trade). The condition – Arizona will receive a first-round pick in 2016 if New York qualifies for the 2016 Stanley Cup playoffs – was converted on April 4, 2016.
 The Los Angeles Kings' first-round pick went to the Carolina Hurricanes as the result of a trade on February 25, 2015 that sent Andrej Sekera to Los Angeles in exchange for Roland McKeown and this pick (being conditional at the time of the trade). The condition – Carolina will receive a first-round pick in 2016 if Los Angeles fails to qualify for the 2015 Stanley Cup playoffs – was converted on April 9, 2015.
 The Chicago Blackhawks' first-round pick went to the Philadelphia Flyers as the result of a trade on June 24, 2016 that sent a first and third-round pick both in 2016 (18th and 79th overall) to Winnipeg in exchange for a second-round pick in 2016 (36th overall) and this pick.
Winnipeg previously acquired this pick from Chicago as the result of a trade on February 25, 2016 that sent Andrew Ladd, Jay Harrison and Matt Fraser to Chicago in exchange for Marko Dano, a conditional third-round pick in 2018 and this pick. 
 The Washington Capitals' first-round pick went to the St. Louis Blues as the result of a trade on June 24, 2016 that sent a first-round pick and Washington's third-round pick both in 2016 (28th and 87th overall) to Washington in exchange for this pick.
 The St. Louis Blues' first-round pick went to the Washington Capitals as the result of a trade on June 24, 2016 that sent a first-round pick in 2016 (26th overall) to St. Louis in exchange for Washington's third-round pick in 2016 (87th overall) and this pick.
 The San Jose Sharks' first-round pick went to the Boston Bruins as the result of a trade on June 30, 2015 that sent Martin Jones to San Jose in exchange for Sean Kuraly and this pick.
 The Pittsburgh Penguins' first-round pick went to the Anaheim Ducks as the result of a trade on June 20, 2016 that sent Frederik Andersen to Toronto in exchange for a second-round pick in 2017 and this pick.
 Toronto previously acquired this pick from Pittsburgh as the result of a trade on July 1, 2015 that sent Phil Kessel, Tyler Biggs, Tim Erixon and a conditional second-round pick in 2016 to Pittsburgh in exchange for Nick Spaling, Kasperi Kapanen, Scott Harrington, New Jersey's third-round pick in 2016 and this pick (being conditional at the time of the trade). The condition – Toronto will receive a first-round pick in 2016 if Pittsburgh qualifies for the 2016 Stanley Cup playoffs – was converted on April 2, 2016.

Round two

Notes

 The Vancouver Canucks' second-round pick went to the Buffalo Sabres as the result of a trade on June 25, 2016 that sent Mark Pysyk, a second-round pick and St. Louis' third-round pick both in 2016 (38th and 89th overall) to Florida in exchange for Dmitry Kulikov and this pick.
Florida previously acquired this pick as the result of a trade on May 25, 2016 that sent Erik Gudbranson and the Islanders fifth-round pick in 2016 to Vancouver in exchange for Jared McCann, a fourth-round pick in 2016 and this pick.
 The Calgary Flames' second-round pick went to the St. Louis Blues as the result of a trade on June 24, 2016 that sent Brian Elliott to Calgary in exchange for a conditional third-round pick in 2018 and this pick.
 The Winnipeg Jets' second-round pick went to the Philadelphia Flyers as the result of a trade on June 24, 2016 that sent a first and third-round pick both in 2016 (18th and 79th overall) to Winnipeg in exchange for Chicago's first-round pick in 2016 (22nd overall) and this pick.
 The Arizona Coyotes' second-round pick went to the Tampa Bay Lightning as the result of a trade on June 25, 2016 that sent Anthony DeAngelo to Arizona in exchange for this pick.
 The Buffalo Sabres' second-round pick went to the Florida Panthers as the result of a trade on June 25, 2016 that sent Dmitri Kulikov and Vancouver's second-round pick in 2016 (33rd overall) to Buffalo in exchange for Mark Pysyk, St. Louis' third-round pick in 2016 (89th overall) and this pick.
 The Montreal Canadiens' second-round pick went to the Chicago Blackhawks as the result of a trade on June 24, 2016 that sent Andrew Shaw to Montreal in exchange for Minnesota's second-round pick in 2016 (45th overall) and this pick.
 The Colorado Avalanche's second-round pick was re-acquired as the result of a trade on June 27, 2015 that sent Buffalo's second-round pick in 2015 to San Jose in exchange for a second-round pick in 2015, Colorado's sixth-round pick in 2017 and this pick.
San Jose previously acquired this pick as the result of a trade on July 1, 2014 that sent Brad Stuart to Colorado in exchange for a sixth-round pick in 2017 and this pick.
 The Boston Bruins' second-round pick went to the Tampa Bay Lightning as the result of a trade on March 2, 2015 that sent Brett Connolly to Boston in exchange for a second-round pick in 2015 and this pick.
 The Minnesota Wild's second-round pick went to the Chicago Blackhawks as the result of a trade on June 24, 2016 that sent Andrew Shaw to Montreal in exchange for a second-round pick in 2016 (39th overall) and this pick.
Montreal previously acquired this pick as the result of a trade on July 1, 2014 that sent Josh Gorges to Buffalo in exchange for this pick.
Buffalo previously acquired this pick as the result of a trade on March 5, 2014 that sent Matt Moulson and Cody McCormick to Minnesota in exchange for Torrey Mitchell, Winnipeg's second-round pick in 2014 and this pick.
 The New York Islanders' second-round pick went to the Boston Bruins as the result of a trade on October 4, 2014 that sent Johnny Boychuk to New York in exchange for Philadelphia's second-round pick in 2015, a conditional third-round pick in 2015 and this pick.
 The New York Rangers' second-round pick went the Chicago Blackhawks as the result of a trade on June 15, 2016 that sent Teuvo Teravainen and Bryan Bickell to Carolina in exchange for Chicago's third-round pick in 2017 and this pick.
Carolina previously acquired this pick as the result of a trade on February 28, 2016 that sent Eric Staal to New York in exchange for Aleksi Saarela, a second-round pick in 2017 and this pick.
 The Chicago Blackhawks' second-round pick went to the Philadelphia Flyers as the result of a trade on February 27, 2015 that sent Kimmo Timonen to Chicago in exchange for a second-round pick in 2015 and this pick (being conditional at the time of the trade). The condition – Philadelphia will receive a second-round pick in 2016 if Chicago advances to the 2015 Stanley Cup Finals with Timonen playing in at least 50% of the Blackhawks' playoff games – was converted on May 30, 2015.
 The Arizona Coyotes' compensatory second-round pick (53rd overall) went to the Detroit Red Wings as the result of a trade on June 24, 2016 that sent Pavel Datsyuk and a first-round pick in 2016 (16th overall) to Arizona in exchange for Joe Vitale, the Rangers' first-round pick in 2016 (20th overall) and this pick.
Arizona previously received this pick as compensation for not signing 2014 first-round draft pick Conner Bleackley, whom they acquired in an earlier trade with Colorado.
 The Florida Panthers' second-round pick went to the Calgary Flames as the result of a trade on February 27, 2016 that sent Jiri Hudler to Florida in exchange for a fourth-round pick in 2018 and this pick.
 The Anaheim Ducks' second-round pick went to the Pittsburgh Penguins as the result of a trade on July 28, 2015 that sent Brandon Sutter and a conditional third-round pick in 2016 to Vancouver in exchange for Nick Bonino, Adam Clendening and this pick.
Vancouver previously acquired this pick as the result of a trade on June 30, 2015 that sent Kevin Bieksa to Anaheim in exchange for this pick.
 The Dallas Stars' second-round pick went the Calgary Flames as the result of a trade on February 29, 2016 that sent Kris Russell to Dallas in exchange for Jyrki Jokipakka, Brett Pollock and this pick (being conditional at thime of the trade). The condition – Calgary will receive a second-round pick in 2016 if Dallas fails to qualify for the 2016 Western Conference Final – was converted on May 11, 2016.
 The Washington Capitals' second-round pick went to the Toronto Maple Leafs as the result of a trade on February 28, 2016 that sent Daniel Winnik and Anaheim's fifth-round pick in 2016 to Washington in exchange for Brooks Laich, Connor Carrick and this pick.
 The Pittsburgh Penguins' second-round pick was re-acquired as the result of a trade on trade on July 1, 2015 that sent Nick Spaling, Kasperi Kapanen, Scott Harrington, New Jersey's third-round pick in 2016 and a conditional first-round pick in 2016 to Toronto in exchange for Phil Kessel, Tyler Biggs, Tim Erixon and this pick (being conditional at the time of the trade). The condition – Pittsburgh will re-acquire their own second-round pick in 2016 if the Penguins qualify for the 2016 Stanley Cup playoffs – was converted on April 2, 2016 when the Penguins clinched a playoff spot.
Toronto previously acquired this pick as the result of a trade on February 25, 2015 in a trade that sent Daniel Winnik to Pittsburgh in exchange for Zach Sill, a fourth-round pick in 2015 and this pick.

Round three

Notes

 The Vancouver Canucks' third-round pick was re-acquired as the result of a trade on July 28, 2015 that sent Nick Bonino, Adam Clendening and Anaheim's second-round pick in 2016 to Pittsburgh in exchange for Brandon Sutter and this pick (being conditional at the time of the trade). The condition – Vancouver will receive the earlier of New York or Vancouver's third-round pick in 2016 – was converted on March 25, 2016 when the Canucks were eliminated from playoff contention ensuring that they would finish behind the Islanders in the overall league standings.
Pittsburgh previously acquired this pick as compensation for Buffalo hiring Dan Bylsma as their head coach on May 28, 2015.
Buffalo previously acquired this pick as the result of a trade on March 2, 2015 that sent Michal Neuvirth to the New York Islanders in exchange for Chad Johnson and this pick.
The Islanders previously acquired this pick as the result of a trade on November 25, 2014 that sent Andrey Pedan to Vancouver in exchange for Alexandre Mallet and this pick.
 The Winnipeg Jets' third round pick went to the Carolina Hurricanes as the result of a trade on February 25, 2015 that sent Jiri Tlusty to Winnipeg in exchange for a conditional sixth-round pick in 2015 and this pick.
 The New Jersey Devils' third-round pick went to the Toronto Maple Leafs as the result of a trade on July 1, 2015 that sent Phil Kessel, Tyler Biggs, Tim Erixon and a conditional second-round pick in 2016 to Pittsburgh in exchange for Nick Spaling, Kasperi Kapanen, Scott Harrington, a conditional first-round pick in 2016 and this pick.
Pittsburgh previously acquired this pick as compensation for New Jersey hiring John Hynes as their head coach on June 2, 2015.
 The Ottawa Senators' third-round pick went to the New Jersey Devils as the result of a trade on June 27, 2015 that sent a second-round pick in 2015 to Ottawa in exchange for Dallas' second-round pick in 2015 and this pick (being conditional at the time of the trade). The condition – New Jersey will receive a fourth-round pick in 2015 or a third-round pick in 2016 at their choice – was converted when New Jersey did not take the 109th pick in the 2015 NHL Entry Draft.
 The Boston Bruins' third-round pick went to the Carolina Hurricanes as the result of a trade on February 29, 2016 that sent John-Michael Liles to Boston in exchange for Anthony Camara, a fifth-round pick in 2017 and this pick.
 The Minnesota Wild's third-round pick went to the Nashville Predators as the result of a trade on June 20, 2016 that sent Jimmy Vesey to Buffalo in exchange for this pick.
Buffalo previously acquired this pick as the result of a trade on February 29, 2016 that sent Jamie McGinn to Anaheim in exchange for this pick (being conditional at the time of the trade). The condition – Buffalo will receive a third-round pick in 2016 if Anaheim does not qualify for the 2016 Western Conference Final – was converted on April 27, 2016 when Anaheim was eliminated from the 2016 Stanley Cup playoffs.
Anaheim previously acquired this pick as the result of a trade on June 26, 2015 that sent Kyle Palmieri to New Jersey in exchange for Florida's second-round pick in 2015 and this pick (being conditional at the time of the trade). The condition – Anaheim will receive the higher of either Florida or Minnesota's third-round pick in 2016. – was converted on April 24, 2016 when Minnesota was eliminated from the 2016 Stanley Cup playoffs ensuring that the Wild's pick would be higher than Florida's.
New Jersey previously acquired this pick as the result of a trade on February 26, 2015 that sent Jaromir Jagr to Florida in exchange for a second-round pick in 2015 and this pick.
Florida previously acquired this pick as the result of a trade on February 24, 2015 that sent Sean Bergenheim and a seventh-round pick in 2016 to Minnesota in exchange for this pick.
 The Detroit Red Wings' third-round pick went to the Pittsburgh Penguins as the result of a trade on June 25, 2016 that sent Beau Bennett to New Jersey in exchange for this pick.
New Jersey previously acquired this pick as the result of a trade on March 2, 2015 that sent Marek Zidlicky to Detroit in exchange for a conditional fifth-round pick in 2015 and this pick (being conditional at the time of the trade). The condition – New Jersey will receive a third-round pick in 2016 if Detroit does not advance to the 2015 Stanley Cup Finals – was converted on April 29, 2015 when Detroit was eliminated from the 2015 Stanley Cup playoffs.
 The Philadelphia Flyers' third-round pick went to the Winnipeg Jets as the result of a trade on June 24, 2016 that sent Chicago's first-round pick and a second-round pick both in 2016 (22nd and 36th overall) to Philadelphia in exchange for a first-round pick in 2016 (18th overall) and this pick.
 The New York Islanders' third-round pick went to the New Jersey Devils as the result of a trade on June 24, 2016 that sent a first-round pick in 2016 (11th overall) to Ottawa in exchange for a first-round pick in 2016 (12th overall) and this pick.
Ottawa previously acquired this pick as the result of a trade on February 29, 2016 that sent Shane Prince and a seventh-round pick in 2016 to New York in exchange for this pick (being conditional at the time of the trade). The condition – Ottawa will receive the lower of New York or Vancouver's third-round pick in 2016 – was converted on March 25, 2016 when the Canucks were eliminated from playoff contention ensuring that they would finish behind the Islanders in the overall league standings.
 The Los Angeles Kings' third-round pick went to the Philadelphia Flyers as the result of a trade on January 6, 2016 that sent Vincent Lecavalier and Luke Schenn to Los Angeles in exchange for Jordan Weal and this pick.
 The Florida Panthers' third-round pick went to the Edmonton Oilers as the result of a trade on February 27, 2016 that sent Teddy Purcell to Florida in exchange for this pick (being conditional at the time of the trade). The condition – Edmonton will receive the lower of Minnesota or Florida's third-round pick in 2016 – was converted on April 24, 2016 when Minnesota was eliminated from the 2016 Stanley Cup playoffs ensuring that the Florida's pick would be lower than Minnesota's.
 The Dallas Stars' third-round pick went to the Buffalo Sabres as the result of a trade on February 11, 2015 that sent Jhonas Enroth to Dallas in exchange for Anders Lindback and this pick (being conditional at the time of the trade). The condition – Buffalo will receive a third-round pick in 2016 if Enroth wins fewer than four playoff games for the Stars in 2015 – was converted on April 6, 2015 when the Stars were eliminated from playoff contention.
 The Washington Capitals' third-round pick was re-acquired as the result of a trade on June 24, 2016 that sent a first-round pick in 2016 (26th overall) to St. Louis in exchange for a first-round pick in 2016 (28th overall) and this pick.
St. Louis previously acquired this pick as the result of a trade on July 2, 2015 that sent T.J. Oshie to Washington in exchange for Troy Brouwer, Pheonix Copley and this pick.
 The St. Louis Blues' third-round pick went to the Florida Panthers as the result of a trade on June 25, 2016 that sent Dmitri Kulikov and Vancouver's second-round pick in 2016 (33rd overall) to Buffalo in exchange for Mark Pysyk, a second-round pick in 2016 (38th overall) and this pick.
Buffalo previously acquired this pick as the result of a trade on February 28, 2014 that sent Ryan Miller, Steve Ott and conditional second and third-round picks in 2014 to St. Louis in exchange for Jaroslav Halak, Chris Stewart, William Carrier, a first-round pick in 2015 and this pick (being conditional at the time of the trade). The condition – Buffalo will receive a third-round pick in 2016 if Miller does not re-sign with St. Louis for the 2014–15 NHL season – was converted on July 1, 2014 when Miller signed with Vancouver.
 The San Jose Sharks' third-round pick went to the Dallas Stars as the result of a trade on November 21, 2014 that sent Brenden Dillon to San Jose in exchange for Jason Demers and this pick.
 The Pittsburgh Penguins' third-round pick went to the Edmonton Oilers as the result of a trade on February 27, 2016 that sent Justin Schultz to Pittsburgh in exchange for this pick.

Round four

Notes

 The Edmonton Oilers' fourth-round pick went to the Anaheim Ducks as the result of a trade on February 29, 2016 that sent Patrick Maroon to Edmonton in exchange for Martin Gernat and this pick.
 The Vancouver Canucks' fourth-round pick went to the Florida Panthers as the result of a trade on May 25, 2016 that sent Erik Gudbranson and the Islanders fifth-round pick in 2016 to Vancouver in exchange for Jared McCann, a second-round pick in 2016 and this pick.
 The Columbus Blue Jackets' fourth-round pick went to the New York Islanders as the result of a trade on June 25, 2016 that sent a fourth-round pick in 2016 (110th overall) and a sixth-round pick in 2017 to Chicago in exchange for this pick.
Chicago previously acquired this pick as the result of a trade on June 30, 2015 that sent Brandon Saad, Michael Paliotta and Alex Broadhurst to Columbus in exchange for Artem Anisimov, Jeremy Morin, Corey Tropp, Marko Dano and this pick.
 The Arizona Coyotes' fourth-round pick went to the New York Rangers as the result of a trade on March 1, 2015 that sent John Moore, Anthony Duclair, Tampa Bay's second-round pick in 2015 and a conditional first-round pick in 2016 to Arizona in exchange for Keith Yandle, Chris Summers and this pick.
 The Colorado Avalanche's fourth-round pick went to the Toronto Maple Leafs as the result of a trade on February 21, 2016 that sent Shawn Matthias to Colorado in exchange for Colin Smith and this pick.
 The Boston Bruins' fourth-round pick went to the New Jersey Devils as the result of a trade on February 29, 2016 that sent Lee Stempniak to Boston in exchange for a second-round pick in 2017 and this pick.
 The New York Islanders' fourth-round pick went to Chicago Blackhawks as the result of a trade on June 25, 2016 that sent Columbus' fourth-round pick in 2016 (95th overall) to New York in exchange for a sixth-round pick in 2017 and this pick.
 The New York Rangers' fourth-round pick went to the San Jose Sharks as the result of a trade on March 1, 2015 that sent James Sheppard to New York in exchange for this pick.
 The San Jose Sharks' fourth-round pick went to the New York Islanders as the result of a trade on June 25, 2016 that sent a fourth-round pick in 2017 to Philadelphia in exchange for this pick.
Philadelphia previously acquired this pick as the result of a trade on June 27, 2015 that sent Nicklas Grossmann and Chris Pronger to Arizona in exchange for Sam Gagner and this pick (being conditional at the time of the trade). The condition – Philadelphia will receive a fourth-round pick in 2016 if Arizona acquires another fourth-round pick in 2016, at Arizona's choice – was converted on June 25, 2016.
Arizona previously acquired this pick as the result of a trade on June 20, 2016 that sent Maxim Letunov and a sixth-round pick in 2017 to San Jose in exchange for Detroit's third-round pick in 2017 and this pick.

Round five

Notes

 The Vancouver Canucks' fifth-round pick went to the Montreal Canadiens as the result of a trade on July 1, 2015 that sent Brandon Prust to Vancouver in exchange for Zack Kassian and this pick.
 The Columbus Blue Jackets' fifth-round pick went to the St. Louis Blues as the result of a trade on November 15, 2014 that sent Jordan Leopold to Columbus in exchange for this pick.
 The Arizona Coyotes' fifth-round pick went to the Dallas Stars as the result of a trade on June 16, 2016 that sent Alex Goligoski to Arizona in exchange for this pick.
 The Montreal Canadiens' fifth-round pick went to the Buffalo Sabres as the result of a trade on March 2, 2015 that sent Brian Flynn to Montreal in exchange for this pick.
 The Minnesota Wild's fifth-round pick went to the Boston Bruins as the result of a trade on June 27, 2015 that sent a fifth-round pick in 2015 to Minnesota in exchange for this pick.
 The New York Islanders' fifth-round pick went to the Vancouver Canucks as the result of a trade on May 25, 2016 that sent Jared McCann, a second and fourth-round pick both in 2016 to Florida in exchange for Erik Gudbranson and this pick.
Florida previously acquired this pick as the result of a trade on June 27, 2015 that sent Montreal's fifth-round pick in 2015 to New York in exchange for this pick.
 The Florida Panthers' fifth-round pick went to the St. Louis Blues as the result of a trade on June 25, 2016 that sent a fifth-round pick in 2017 to Chicago in exchange for this pick.
Chicago previously acquired this pick as the result of a trade on March 2, 2014 that sent Brandon Pirri to Florida in exchange for a third-round pick in 2014 and this pick.
 The Anaheim Ducks' fifth-round pick went to the Washington Capitals as the result of a trade on February 28, 2016 that sent Brooks Laich, Connor Carrick and a second-round pick in 2016 to Toronto in exchange for Daniel Winnik and this pick. 
Toronto previously acquired this pick as the result of a trade on March 2, 2015 that sent Korbinian Holzer to Anaheim in exchange for Eric Brewer and this pick.
 The St. Louis Blues' fifth-round pick went to the Edmonton Oilers as the result of a trade on February 27, 2016 that sent Anders Nilsson to St. Louis in exchange for Niklas Lundstrom and this pick.

Round six

Notes

 The Boston Bruins' sixth-round pick was re-acquired as the result of a trade on June 25, 2015, that sent Carl Soderberg to Colorado in exchange for this pick.
Colorado previously acquired this pick as the result of a trade on March 2, 2015, that sent Max Talbot and Paul Carey to Boston in exchange for Jordan Caron and this pick.
 The Minnesota Wild's sixth-round pick went to the Calgary Flames as the result of a trade on February 29, 2016, that sent David Jones to Minnesota in exchange for Niklas Backstrom and this pick.
 The Los Angeles Kings' sixth-round pick went to the Philadelphia Flyers as the result of a trade on June 27, 2015, that sent Columbus' fourth-round pick in 2015 to Los Angeles in exchange for a fourth-round pick in 2015 and this pick.
 The Florida Panthers' sixth-round pick went to the New York Rangers as the result of a trade on June 20, 2016, that sent Keith Yandle to Florida in exchange for a conditional fourth-round pick in 2017 and this pick.
 The Anaheim Ducks' sixth-round pick went the Florida Panthers as the result of a trade on February 29, 2016, that sent Brandon Pirri to Anaheim in exchange for this pick.
 The St. Louis Blues' sixth-round pick went to the Toronto Maple Leafs as the result of a trade March 2, 2015, that sent Olli Jokinen to St. Louis in exchange for Joakim Lindstrom and this pick (being conditional at the time of the trade). The condition – Toronto will receive a sixth-round pick in 2016 if St. Louis fails to make it to the 2015 Stanley Cup Finals – was converted on April 26, 2015.

Round seven

Notes

 The Winnipeg Jets' seventh-round pick went to the Montreal Canadiens as the result of a trade on June 25, 2016 that sent a seventh-round pick in 2017 to Winnipeg in exchange for this pick.
 The Montreal Canadiens' seventh-round pick went to the Buffalo Sabres as the result of a trade on March 2, 2015 that sent Torrey Mitchell to Montreal in exchange for Jack Nevins and this pick.
 The Ottawa Senators' seventh-round pick went the New York Islanders as the result of a trade on February 29, 2016 that sent a conditional third-round pick in 2016 to Ottawa in exchange for Shane Prince and this pick.
 The Carolina Hurricanes' seventh-round pick went to the Vancouver Canucks as the result of a trade on June 27, 2015 that sent Eddie Lack to Carolina in exchange for a third-round pick in 2015 and this pick.
 The Boston Bruins' seventh-round pick went to the Florida Panthers as the result of a trade on June 25, 2016 that sent a seventh-round pick in 2017 to Boston in exchange for this pick.
 The Florida Panthers' seventh-round pick went to the Minnesota Wild as the result of a trade on February 24, 2015 that sent a third-round pick in 2016 to Florida in exchange for Sean Bergenheim and this pick.
 The Dallas Stars' seventh-round pick went to the Tampa Bay Lightning as the result of a trade on June 27, 2015 that sent Anaheim's seventh-round pick in 2015 to Edmonton in exchange for this pick.
Edmonton previously acquired this pick as the result of a trade on July 5, 2013 that sent Shawn Horcoff to Dallas in exchange for Philip Larsen and this pick.
 The Pittsburgh Penguins' seventh-round pick went to the St. Louis Blues as the result of a trade on March 2, 2015 that sent Ian Cole to Pittsburgh in exchange for Robert Bortuzzo and this pick.

Draftees based on nationality

North American Draftees by State/Province

Draftees based on league

Draftees based on junior/college team
Minimum three selections

See also
 2013–14 NHL transactions
 2014–15 NHL transactions
 2015–16 NHL transactions
 2016–17 NHL transactions
 2016–17 NHL season
 List of first overall NHL draft picks
 List of NHL players

References

External links
2016 NHL Entry Draft player stats at The Internet Hockey Database

NHL Entry Draft
National Hockey League Entry Draft
Entry Draft
2016 in sports in New York (state)
Sports in Buffalo, New York